Judge Jack may refer to:

George W. Jack (1875–1924), judge of the United States District Court for the Western District of Louisiana
Janis Graham Jack (born 1946), judge of the United States District Court for the Southern District of Texas